Dívka na koštěti, or The Girl on the Broomstick, is a 1972 Czechoslovak fantasy-comedy film directed by Václav Vorlíček. It tells a story of a teenage witch, Saxana (played by Petra Černocká) who, facing 300 years' detention for failing her classes, escapes to the human world with the help of a school janitor. Once in the human world, she meets Honza, a teenage boy, who takes her to school with him. At school, Saxana becomes acquainted with three of the schools' teenage delinquents, who convince her to turn the faculty into rabbits by lying and promising her that they will help in her quest to stay in the human world. The theme song, 'Saxana', sung by Petra Černocká, features in the opening and ending credits. 
A sequel was released in 2011, which follows Saxana's daughter.

Cast

Petra Černocká – Saxana
Jan Hrušínský – Honza Bláha
Jan Kraus – Miky Rousek
František Filipovský – Rousek
Vladimír Menšík – Upír v.v. (retired vampire, janitor)
Vlastimil Zavřel – Bohouš Adámek
Michal Hejný – Čenda Bujnoch
Stella Zázvorková – Vondráčková
Míla Myslíková – Bláhová
Josef Bláha – Ředitel čarodějnické školy (Wizardry school headmaster)
Jiří Lír – Učitel botaniky (Botany teacher)
Jaromír Spal – Bláha

External links

1972 films
1970s Czech-language films
Czechoslovak fantasy films
1970s fantasy comedy films
Films directed by Václav Vorlíček
Czech fantasy comedy films
1972 comedy films